Neocrepidodera is a genus of flea beetles in the family Chrysomelidae, containing some 100 described species worldwide.

Selected species

N. acuminata (Jacoby, 1885)
N. adelinae (Binaghi, 1947)
N. albanica (Mohr, 1965)
N. arunachalensis (Basu, 1991)
N. basalis (K. Daniel, 1900)
N. bolognai (Biondi, 1982)
N. brevicollis (J. Daniel, 1904)
N. carolinae Baselga & Novoa, 2005
N. cheni (Gressitt & Kimoto, 1963)
N. chinensis Gruev, 1981
N. convexa (Gressitt & Kimoto, 1963)
N. corpulenta (Kutschera, 1860)
N. crassicornis (Faldermann, 1837)
N. cyanescens (Duftschmid, 1825)
N. cyanipennis (Kutschera, 1860)
N. danahina (Basu, 1991)
N. femorata (Gyllenhal, 1813)
N. ferruginea (Scopoli, 1763)
N. fulva Kimoto, 1991
N. gruevi (Kimoto, 1983)
N. himalayana (L. N. Medvedev & Sprecher-Uebersax, 1997)
N. hispanica (J. Daniei, 1904)
N. hummeli (S.-H. Chen, 1934)
N. impressa (Fabricius, 1801)
N. interpunctata (Motschulsky, 1859)
N. irrorata (L. N. Medvedev, 1997)
N. komatsui (Nakane, 1963)
N. konstantinovi Baselga, 2006
N. kozhantshikovi (Jakobson, 1926)
N. laevicollis (Jacoby, 1885)
N. ligurica (J. Daniel, 1904)
N. manobioides (S.-H. Chen, 1939)
N. melanopus (Kutschera, 1860)
N. melanostoma (L. Redtenbacher, 1849)
N. minima (Gressitt & Kimoto, 1963)
N. motschulskii (Konstantinov, 1991)
N. naini (Scherer, 1969)
N. nepalica (L. N. Medvedev, 1990)
N. nigritula (Gyllenhal, 1813)
N. nobilis (J. Daniel, 1904)
N. norica (Weise, 1890)
N. obirensis (Ganglbauer, 1897)
N. obscuritarsis (Motschulsky, 1859)
N. oculata (Gressitt & Kimoto, 1963)
N. ohkawai Takizawa, 2002
N. pallida (Fall, 1910)
N. peirolerii (Kutschera, 1860)
N. peregrina (Harold, 1875)
N. precaria Baselga & Novoa, 2005
N. puncticollis (Reitter, 1879)
N. recticollis (Jacoby, 1885)
N. resina (Gressitt & Kimoto, 1963)
N. rhaetica (Kutsehera, 1860)
N. robusta (J. L. LeConte, 1874)
N. satoi Takizawa, 2002
N. schenklingi Csiki, 1939
N. sibirica (Pic, 1909)
N. simplicipes (Kutsehera, 1860)
N. spectabilis (J. Daniel, 1904)
N. springeri (Heikertinger, 1923)
N. sublaevis (Motschulsky, 1859)
N. taiwana (Kimoto, 1996)
N. takara Nakane, 1963
N. thoracica (L. N. Medvedev, 1990)
N. transsilvanica (Fuss, 1864)
N. transversa (Marsharn, 1802)
N. wittmeri (L. N. Medvedev, 1997)

References

Further reading
 
 
 

 
Chrysomelidae genera